Gélita Hoarau (born 15 January 1956) is a member of the Senate of France, representing the island of Réunion.  She is a member of the Communist, Republican, and Citizen Group.  Her husband is Élie Hoarau.

References
Page on the Senate website

1956 births
Living people
Senators of Réunion
French Senators of the Fifth Republic
Members of the Regional Council of Réunion
Women members of the Senate (France)
Women from Réunion in politics
21st-century French women politicians
Réunionnais communists